Qoli Kandi (also Romanized as Qolī Kandī) is a village in Gavdul-e Markazi Rural District, in the Central District of Malekan County, East Azerbaijan Province, Iran. At the 2006 census, its population was 465, in 120 families.

References 

Populated places in Malekan County